Gregory Mandel is Provost and Laura H. Carnell Professor of Law at Temple University.  He previously served as Dean of the Temple University Beasley School of Law. He succeeds former Provost JoAnne A. Epps, who has returned to the faculty of the Temple University Beasley School of Law.

Undergraduate 
Dean Mandel received his J.D. from Stanford Law School and his undergraduate degree in physics and astronomy from Wesleyan University. He worked on NASA's Hubble Space Telescope prior to attending law school. Dean Mandel has taught Introduction to Intellectual Property, Patent Law, Advanced Patent Law, and Property.

Career 
Gregory N. Mandel is the Provost and Laura H. Carnell Professor of Law at Temple University. He specializes in intellectual property law, innovation, and the interface among technology and law. Dean Mandel's publications have been selected as among the best intellectual property and patent law articles of the year three times. His article Patently Non-Obvious was identified as one of the most cited patent law articles of the past decade, and his experimental studies have been cited by the Court of Appeals for the Federal Circuit and in briefs filed before the United States Supreme Court.

Provost Mandel was awarded a prestigious three-year grant from the National Science Foundation to conduct a series of experiments on the psychology of intellectual property in the United States and China. He has previously served on the Executive Committee of the Intellectual Property Section of the American Association of Law Schools, an American Bar Association task force to brief the Environmental Protection Agency on arising nanotechnology legal issues, and is the recipient of a Fulbright Senior Specialist grant to teach U.S. intellectual property law to foreign law students. 

Provost Mandel is the author of over fifty scholarly articles and chapters and has given over 150 presentations, including for the United Nations, Second Circuit, Patent and Trademark Office, Environmental Protection Agency, American Bar Association, American Psychological Association, National Academy of Science, and European Commission.

Provost Mandel was President of the Board of The Miquon School from 2013-2015. His pro bono legal work includes a prominent asylum case before the Attorney General of the United States and the Ninth Circuit Court of Appeals. 

Provost Mandel served as the Temple University School of Law's Associate Dean for Research from 2009-2016 and was Associate Dean for Research and Professor of Law at Albany Law School prior to joining Temple. 

Before entering academia, he practiced law with Skadden, Arps, Slate, Meagher & Flom LLP and Affiliates, clerked for Judge Joseph Jerome Farris, United States Court of Appeals for the Ninth Circuit, and interned with Chief Judge Anthony Joseph Scirica, United States Court of Appeals for the Third Circuit.

References

Year of birth missing (living people)
Living people
Wesleyan University alumni
Stanford Law School alumni
American legal scholars
American lawyers
Deans of law schools in the United States
Temple University administrators